Sequenced Packet Exchange (SPX) is a protocol in the IPX/SPX protocol stack that corresponds to a connection-oriented transport layer protocol in the OSI model. Being reliable and connection-oriented, it is analogous to the Transmission Control Protocol (TCP) of TCP/IP, but it is a datagram protocol, rather than a stream protocol.

SPX packet structure

Each SPX packet begins with a header with the following structure:

The Connection Control fields contains 4 single-bit flags:

The Datastream Type serves to close the SPX connection. For this purpose two values are used:

External links
 SPX, Sequenced Packet Exchange
 IPX / SPX Packet Structures

Novell NetWare
Transport layer protocols